Anthony Richard Tuddenham (born 28 September 1956) is an English former professional footballer who played in the Football League as a defender. Born in Reepham, Norfolk, Tuddenham began his youth career at West Ham United and played in the 1975 FA Youth Cup Final against Ipswich Town. He did not make a senior league appearance for the club, moving on shortly afterwards to Cambridge United, for whom he played 12 times over the next two seasons, scoring twice. In 1977, he moved into non-league football with Cambridge City.

He then worked for Norwich Union and now lives in Fakenham.

References
General
. Retrieved 22 October 2013.
Specific

1956 births
Living people
People from Reepham, Norfolk
English footballers
Association football defenders
West Ham United F.C. players
Cambridge United F.C. players
Cambridge City F.C. players
English Football League players
People from Fakenham
Aviva people